Thamburaatti is a 1978 Indian Malayalam film, directed N. Sankaran Nair. The film stars Adoor Bhasi, Prameela, Suresh and Meena in the lead roles. The film has musical score by G. Devarajan.

Cast
Adoor Bhasi as Thampuran
Prameela as Ragini Thampuratti
Suresh as Krishnan, Gopan (double role)
Meena as Thampuratti's mother
Prathapachandran as Rema's father
Reena as Rema, Leela (double role)
Kaduvakulam Antony as Padmanabha Kurup
P. R. Menon as Gopan's father
Vanchiyoor Radha as Rema's mother
 Paul Vengola
Rajasekharan as Police Officer
 Nagarajan
 Professor Vijayan
 Aravindhakshan
 Ku njiraman
 Sreedharan
 A.M Namboothiri
 Ragava Menon
 J. Lakshmi

Soundtrack
The music was composed by G. Devarajan and the lyrics were written by Kavalam Narayana Panicker.

References

External links
 

1978 films
1970s Malayalam-language films
Films directed by N. Sankaran Nair